Grand Slam Opera is a 1936 American short comedy film starring Buster Keaton.

Plot
Elmer Butts (Keaton) is seen off by his friends as he boards a train to begin his journey to attempt a career in show business. He intends to audition for the radio show Colonel Crow's Amateur Night, but the show ends before he is able to audition. Meets a beautiful young girl (who it transpires lives downstairs from him) and asks her out but is turned down. That night he practices several dance routines in his bedroom which angers the girl, he asks her out again but is once again turned down.

The next day Elmer attempts to audition for 'Amateur Night' once again but there is already an audition in process. As he sits in the waiting room, Elmer prepares himself by dancing to the various styles of music he hears emanating from the next room.

Elmer finally gets his turn to audition for the show but is met with mockery when he reveals that he is a juggler and intends to describe his juggling techniques to the audience listening at home. During Elmer's performance he gets into several scuffles with the band leader who is trying to conduct music in the background. The live audience watching the show find the performance hilarious but Elmer is thrown out. Four weeks pass and Elmer is seen hitch-hiking at the side of a road. Overhearing a nearby car's radio he learns that his performance was voted the best of the night by the audience and his £100 prize has gone unclaimed. Elmer dashes back to the studio (via train, car and on foot) and his newly found wealth and popularity convinces the girl to finally go on a date with him.

Cast
 Buster Keaton as Elmer Butts
 Diana Lewis as The Girl Downstairs
 Harold Goodwin as Band Leader
 John Ince as Colonel Crowe
 Melrose Coakley
 Bud Jamison as Arizona Sheriff
 Eddie Fetherston

See also
 Buster Keaton filmography

External links

 Grand Slam Opera at the International Buster Keaton Society

1936 films
1936 comedy films
1936 short films
American black-and-white films
Educational Pictures short films
Films directed by Buster Keaton
Films directed by Charles Lamont
Films with screenplays by Buster Keaton
American comedy short films
1930s American films